Christian Dickson Walker (born March 28, 1991) is an American professional baseball first baseman for the Arizona Diamondbacks of Major League Baseball (MLB). He previously played for the Baltimore Orioles.

Amateur career
Walker attended Kennedy-Kenrick Catholic High School in Norristown, Pennsylvania. He was drafted by the Los Angeles Dodgers in the 49th round of the 2009 Major League Baseball draft, but did not sign. Walker attended the University of South Carolina and played college baseball for the South Carolina Gamecocks from 2010 to 2012. While there, he helped the Gamecocks win the College World Series in 2010 and 2011. He also helped the team reach the 2012 College World Series, where they lost to the Arizona Wildcats. He finished tied with Dustin Ackley for most career hits in the College World Series. Overall in his career at South Carolina, he played in 206 games and hit 336/.427/.533 with 30 home runs and 137 runs batted in. In 2011, he played collegiate summer baseball with the Harwich Mariners of the Cape Cod Baseball League.

Professional career

Baltimore Orioles
The Baltimore Orioles selected Walker in the fourth round of the 2012 Major League Baseball draft. He made his debut for the Aberdeen IronBirds. He played in 22 games and hit .284/.376/.420 with two home runs. Walker started 2013 with the Delmarva Shorebirds. In May he was promoted to the Frederick Keys. In July he played in the All-Star Futures Game. After the game he was promoted to the Double-A Bowie Baysox. He finished the year playing in 103 games and hit .300/.362/.453 with 11 home runs. Walker started 2014 back with Bowie.

On September 17, 2014, Walker was called up to the Orioles from AAA-Norfolk. He made his major league debut later that day. Facing Toronto Blue Jays pitcher J. A. Happ, Walker hit a double for his first major league hit. On September 20, he had his first multi-hit game, including his first career major league home run, off of Boston Red Sox starter, Rubby De La Rosa.

On February 21, 2017, the Orioles designated Walker for assignment.

Arizona Diamondbacks
The Atlanta Braves claimed Walker off of waivers on February 25. On March 6, 2017, the Cincinnati Reds claimed Walker.

On March 28, 2017, Walker was waived by the Reds and claimed by the Arizona Diamondbacks who assigned him to the Reno Aces of the Pacific Coast League (PCL). He was selected as the 2017 PCL Most Valuable Player.

Walker was called up again and played in 11 games in 2017 for the Diamondbacks, batting .250 with 2 homers. He played in 37 games in 2018, for a .163 average with 3 home runs.

In 2019, Walker hit .259/.348/.476 with 29 home runs and 73 RBIs. He had a 9 Defensive Runs Saved (DRS) rating, the best in the National League among first basemen, and led all major league first basemen with 139 assists. In the pandemic-shortened 2020 season, he hit .271/.333/.459 with 7 home runs and 34 RBIs.

On January 13, 2023, Walker agreed to a one-year, $6.5 million contract with the Diamondbacks, avoiding salary arbitration.

References

External links

South Carolina Gamecocks bio

1991 births
Living people
People from Montgomery County, Pennsylvania
Baseball players from Pennsylvania
Baltimore Orioles players
Arizona Diamondbacks players
South Carolina Gamecocks baseball players
Harwich Mariners players
Aberdeen IronBirds players
Delmarva Shorebirds players
Frederick Keys players
Bowie Baysox players
Norfolk Tides players
Reno Aces players
Major League Baseball first basemen
Gold Glove Award winners